Aldo Giorgio Gargani (1933 in Genova – 18 June 2009 in Pisa) was an Italian philosopher.

He studied philosophy at the Scuola Normale Superiore in Pisa, Oxford University, and Queen's College. He was professor of Aesthetics and History of Philosophy at the University of Pisa.

He is considered to be the most important Italian scholar of Wittgenstein. His writings introduced many British and American authors to an Italian audience.

Works
A. G. Gargani, ed.Mimesis 2009

A. G. Gargani, ed.Cortina Raffaello 2008

A. G. Gargani, ed.Ets 2005

A. G. Gargani, ed. Plus 2003

A. G. Gargani, ed. Laterza 2002

A. G. Gargani, ed. Laterza 1999

A. G. Gargani, ed. Laterza 1998

A. G. Gargani, ed. Einaudi 1997

A. G. Gargani, ed. Laterza 1995

A. G. Gargani, ed. Guerini e Associati 1994

External links
   Italian interview to Aldo Gargani, April 4, 2008

1933 births
2009 deaths
20th-century essayists
20th-century Italian non-fiction writers
20th-century Italian philosophers
21st-century essayists
21st-century Italian non-fiction writers
21st-century Italian philosophers
Analytic philosophers
Historians of philosophy
Italian logicians
Italian male non-fiction writers
Philosophers of art
Philosophers of logic
Philosophers of mind
Philosophy academics
Philosophy writers
Wittgensteinian philosophers